The Lanyu Weather Station is a weather station in Orchid Island, Taitung County, Taiwan.

History
The weather station was constructed in 1940 during the Japanese rule of Taiwan and established under the name Red Head Island Weather Station. The station was heavily damaged during the World War II by the United States Armed Forces. After the war ended, the station was restored to its original condition.

See also
 Geography of Taiwan
 Yushan weather station

References

1940 establishments in Taiwan
Buildings and structures completed in 1940
Buildings and structures in Taitung County
Meteorological observatories in Taiwan